Million Writers Award was a short story literary award presented annually by storySouth. It honored the best online short stories. The award was structured to be egalitarian allowing for anyone to nominate a story including readers, authors, editors and publishers; prize money was donated by readers and writers; and the winners were selected by public vote from a short-list of entries selected by judges.

Overview
The Million Writers Award was founded by author Jason Sanford in 2003 at a time when the literary establishment "didn't believe online magazines were legitimate places to publish fiction," seeing it as a fad. Sanford set out to honor and highlight online only publications and stories with the award.

Stories eligible for the award include those first published in online literary journals, magazines, and e-zines that have an editorial process. The award has a variable cash prize, in 2011 for example it was $600 for the winner, $200 for the runner-up and $100 for third place. Prize money is raised through donations from writers, editors and readers and thus fluctuates each year. Anyone can nominate up to one story, while editors and publishers can nominate three stories. Stories must be at least 1000 words.

The award has become one of the premier online literary awards and was named a Hot Site by USA Today. The award was profiled in a six-page feature interview with editor Jason Sanford in the 2005 Novel and Short Story Writer's Market and mentioned in The 100 Best Trends, 2006: Emerging Developments You Can't Afford to Ignore as an example of the emerging online literary movement.

In 2012 Spotlight Publishing released two anthologies of stories from the Million Writers Award, with one focused on literary stories and the other on science fiction and fantasy stories.

Winners
Previous winners.

2003
Top 10 stories:

2004
Best story: Randa Jarrar, "You Are a 14-Year-Old Arab Chick Who Just Moved to Texas" (Eyeshot)
Best online publication: Eclectica
Best publisher of novella-length fiction: The King's English
Best new online magazine or journal: Narrative Magazine

2005
Best story: Alicia Gifford, "Toggling the Switch" (Narrative Magazine)
Best story runnerup: Terry Bisson, "Super 8" (Scifiction.com)
Best story runnerup: Anjana Basu, "The Black Tongue" (Gowanus) 
Best online publication: Strange Horizons
Best publisher of novella-length fiction: The King's English
Best new online magazine or journal: Anderbo

2006
Best story: Richard Bowes, "There's a Hole in the City" (Scifiction.com)
Best story runnerup: Michael Croley, "Two Lives" (Blackbird)
Best online publication: Storyglossia
Best publisher of novella-length fiction: Narrative Magazine (co-winner)
Best publisher of novella-length fiction: The King's English (co-winner)
Best new online magazine or journal: Menda City Review (co-winner)
Best new online magazine or journal: Clarkesworld Magazine (co-winner)

2007
Best story: Catherynne M. Valente, "Urchins, While Swimming" (Clarkesword Magazine)
Best story runnerup: A. Ray Norsworthy, "All the Way to Grangeville" (Eclectica Magazine)
Best story runnerup: Marshall Moore, "The Infinite Monkey Theorem" (Word Riot)
Best online publication: Blackbird
Best publisher of novella-length fiction: Jim Baen's Universe
Best new online magazine or journal: Farrago's Wainscot

2008
Best story: Matt Bell, "Alex Trebek Never Eats Fried Chicken" (Storyglossia)
Best story runnerup: Sruthi Thekkiam, "Friday Afternoons on Bus 51" (Blackbird)
Best online publication: Narrative Magazine
Best publisher of novella-length fiction: (no award)
Best new online magazine or journal: Cha: An Asian Literary Journal

2009
Winner: Jenny Williams, "The Fisherman's Wife" (LitNImage)
Runner-up: Roderic Crooks, "Fuckbuddy" (Eyeshot)
Honorable mention: Geronimo Madrid, "No Bullets in the House" (Drunken Boat)
Best online publication: Fantasy Magazine
Best publisher of novella-length fiction: Subterranean Magazine
Best new online magazine or journal: Kill Author

2010
Winner: Summer Block, "Hospitality" (Wheelhouse Magazine)
Runner-up: Rachel Swirsky, "Eros, Philia, Agape" (Tor.com)
Honorable mention: Eric Beetner, "Ditch" (Thuglit)
Best online publication: Words Without Borders
Best new online magazine or journal: Lightspeed Magazine

2011
Winner: Adam-Troy Castro, "Arvies" (Lightspeed Magazine)
Runner-up: Eric Maroney, "The Incorrupt Body of Carlo Busso" (Eclectica)
Honorable mention: Amal El-Mohtar, "The Green Book" (Apex Magazine)

2012
Winner: xTx, "The Mill Pond" (StoryGlossia)
Runner-up: Kelly Cherry, "On Familiar Terms" (Blackbird)
Honorable mention: Micah Dean Hicks, "The Butcher's Chimes" (Menda City Review)

2013
First place : Rachel Steiger-Meister, "Chlorine Mermaid" (Carve Magazine)
Second place: Lou Gaglia, "Hands" (Waccamaw)
Third place : Adrienne Celt, "The Eternal Youth of Everyone Else" (Carve Magazine)

2014
First place: Caroline Casper, "Eminence" (Carve Magazine)
Second place: Susan Tepper, "Distance" (Thrice Fiction)
Third place: Carmen Maria Machado, "Inventory" (Strange Horizons)
2015
First place: Wendy Oleson, “The Snow Children” (Carve Magazine)
Second place: Chikodili Emelumadu, “Jermyn” (Eclectica)
Third place: Allegra Hyde, “Syndication” (Nashville Review)
2016
First place: Reza Ghasemi Ataee, "Anatomy of Mr.wakefield" (Time magazine)
Second place: Jude Whelchel, "Big Joy Family" (North Carolina Literary Review)
Third place: Annie Reid, "Last Song" (Baltimore Review)

References

External links
Million Writers Awards, storySouth, official website.

American literary awards
Short story awards
Awards established in 2003